The Trivandrum Observatory or Thiruvananthapuram Astronomical Observatory is a scientific and astronomical observation station that was established by the Raja of Travancore Swathi Thirunal Rama Varma in 1836-37. The Raja wrote to the British Resident, Colonel James Stuart Fraser, an amateur scientist proposing the establishment of an astronomical observatory. This led to John Caldecott who earlier ran a small personal observatory at Allepey being appointed as the royal astronomer. The observatory was located on the highest point in the city and opposite the palace and was considered important as the magnetic equator at that time passed through Trivandrum. The observatory was designed by Lieutenant W H Horsley of the Madras Engineers.

Caldecott also began taking meteorological measurements from July 1837 and expanded to another building in 1842 that housed a Dollond equatorial circle. A Travancore Almanac was published in 1838. Caldecott travelled to Europe in 1839 to obtain additional instruments and during this period the observatory was headed by Sperschneider. Caldecott died in 1849 and from January 1852 it was headed by John Allan Broun. Broun and his assistants including J. Kochukunju (Cochoocoonjoo) and E. Kochiravi (Cocheravey) Pillai and several "computers" helped publish the Trivandrum Magnetic Observations in 1874.

The observatory is now a part of the University of Kerala.

See also

 List of astronomical observatories
 Madhava Observatory

References

External links 
Kerala University website
Kurian, Priya (2008) History of Astronomical Science in Kerala. Ph.D. thesis. University of Kerala.

Astronomical observatories in India